"One Step at a Time" is the third and final single from American pop/R&B singer Jordin Sparks from her self-titled debut album. Written by Robbie Nevil, Lauren Evans, Jonas Jeberg and Mich Hansen the song was released in the U.S. on June 10, 2008. Sparks performed the song on the season finale of the seventh season of American Idol.

When the song reached number seventeen on the Billboard Hot 100 (Week Ending August 27, 2008), Sparks became the only American Idol contestant ever to have their first four singles all crack the Top 20 of the Billboard Hot 100. The song peaked at number three on the Mainstream Top 40 airplay chart.

The song served as Sparks' third UK single and digitally released on January 26. It surpassed the success of previous single "Tattoo" as it was A-Listed on Radio 1's playlist on January 14, 2009. On February 1, 2009, the song reached a peak of number sixteen on the UK Singles Chart despite no physical release. The single also reached number two in New Zealand, number eleven in Canada, and number twelve in Australia.

Background and composition 
The lyrics for the song were written by Robbie Nevil and Lauren Evans with Jordin Sparks in mind, as the writers were familiar with her appearance on American Idol and how "she auditioned in Los Angeles but didn't make it to Hollywood Week and had the courage to audition again." When writing the song, they imagined "her heels walking on the sidewalk" and eventually the song "told Jordin's story and my story and everybody's story who pursues music", according to Evans.

"One Step at a Time" was written by Robbie Nevil, Lauren Evans, Jonas Jeberg, and Cutfather, while production was handled by Jeberg and Cutfather. According to the sheet music published at Musicnotes.com by Almo Music Corporation, the song is performed in the key of D-flat major with a tempo of 102 beats per minute.  The song follows a chord progression of Em–D–Bm–A, and Sparks' vocals span two octaves, from A3 to A5.

Critical reception
In his review of the single, Chuck Taylor at Billboard stated that "One Step at a Time" was "a beautifully blended, soulful number percolating with optimism".  Entertainment Weekly, on its website, encouraged readers to download the song, as they had a "sudden epiphany that Jordin Sparks has put out three good songs in a row".

Promotion
Sparks performed this song on the season 7 finale of American Idol, Live with Regis and Kelly, So You Think You Can Dance, Macy's Fourth of July Fireworks Spectacular, Good Morning America, and Canadian Idol. "One Step At A Time" was also used in advertisements for the USA TV series, The Starter Wife, starring Debra Messing.

Chart performance
The song debuted at number 79 on the Billboard Hot 100 chart, and peaked at number seventeen, giving Sparks her fourth consecutive Hot 100 top twenty hit. This makes Sparks the only American Idol contestant to have her first four singles reach the top twenty of the Hot 100. The song's current digital sales in the U.S. stand at around 1,300,000.

On the Billboard Pop 100, it  became her third consecutive top ten and second top five hit, reaching number five. It also became Sparks' third consecutive top twenty hit on the Canadian Hot 100 where it has peaked at number eleven. In Australia, "One Step at a Time" debuted at a promising number 78 and eventually peaked at number twelve. In New Zealand the song debuted at number 27 and peaked at number two, becoming Sparks' second consecutive top five hit there. The song was certified Gold in New Zealand on November 30, 2008, selling over 7,500 copies.
On January 11, 2009, the song entered the UK Singles Chart at number 56 on downloads alone and eventually peaked at number sixteen.

Music video
The music video for "One Step at a Time" was filmed the weekend of May 4, 2008 in Los Angeles, with renowned director Ray Kay. The official music video was added on the popular video sharing site YouTube via Sparks' official channel on May 28, 2008, but was quickly removed then added back on June 5, 2008. The official video later made its official debut on Amazon.com on June 9, 2008. After the premiere, the music video was available for purchase on the iTunes Music Store. The video made its television premiere on Canada's MuchMusic on June 18, 2008.

The video revolves around Sparks taking a tour around the city as other people are going through different moments. Different scenarios play out including a guy picking up his date for prom, a teenager (Corbin Bleu) teaching his little brother to skateboard, two teenagers painting a park bench, a boy and a girl selling lemonade, a young woman at her first day of college, and a group of teenagers taking care of a garden. Throughout the video, the camera pans to Sparks' as well as the other subject's feet (basically keeping with the song's title). At the end, Sparks flashes her palm at the camera, the words, "I ♥ you WENDY" visible, apparently written in marker. Wendy was a family friend who died of  melanoma. Her younger brother, PJ, also makes an appearance in the video.

Track listing
"One Step at a Time" (Main Version) – 3:25
"One Step at a Time" (Grayson Remix) – 4:38
"One Step at a Time" (Nevin's Radio Mix) – 3:22
"One Step at a Time" (Rizzo Funk Generation Club Mix) – 6:47
"One Step at a Time" (Tonal Remix) – 4:44

Personnel
Songwriting – Robbie Nevil, Lauren Evans, Jonas Jeberg, Mich Hansen
Production – Jonas Jeberg, Cutfather, Robbie Nevil
Recording, keyboards and programming – Jonas Jeberg
Vocal recording – Robbie Nevil
Vocal engineering – Adam Kagen
Assistant vocal engineering – Eric Rennaker
Backing vocals – Lauren Evans
Percussion – Mich Hansen
Mixing – Manny Marroquin
Assistant mixing – Jared Robbins

Source:

Charts and certifications

Charts

Year-end charts

Certifications

Release history

References

External links

2007 songs
2008 singles
Jordin Sparks songs
Music videos directed by Ray Kay
Songs written by Robbie Nevil
Songs written by Cutfather
Songs written by Lauren Evans
Songs written by Jonas Jeberg
Jive Records singles
Song recordings produced by Cutfather